Loon Straits is a community in the Canadian province of Manitoba. A designated place in Canadian census data, the community had a population of 16 in the Canada 2006 Census.

The community had been settled by largely Metis settlers of mixed Cree/ Ojibway (Or Saulteaux as it was known in the past)/Irish/Scottish heritage.

Demographics 

References

 Loon Straits Community Profile

Designated places in Manitoba
Northern communities in Manitoba